Confessions of a Driving Instructor is a 1976 British sex-farce film. This was the third instalment of the Confessions sequence on the erotic adventures of Timothy Lea, based on the novels published under the name by Christopher Wood.

Plot
Timothy joins his brother-in-law's driving school. Their school is soon in rivalry with a competing school, while Timothy finds himself involved in erotic adventures with his clients, secretary and landlady. His clients are a mix of the inept and the dangerous and, as usual, mayhem ensues. A rugby match is organised between the two schools, at which one of the rival school's instructors unknowingly swallows a powerful aphrodisiac and rampages around the field, an event that leads to the climactic car chase.

Cast
Robin Askwith	.... 	Timothy Lea
Antony Booth      .... 	Sidney Noggett
Bill Maynard	.... 	Walter Lea
Doris Hare	        .... 	Mrs Lea
Sheila White .... Rosie Noggett
Windsor Davies	.... 	Mr Truscott
Liz Fraser	        .... 	Mrs Chalmers
Irene Handl	.... 	Miss Slenderparts
George Layton	.... 	Tony Bender
Lynda Bellingham   ....    Mary Truscott
Avril Angers       ....    Mrs. Truscott
John Junkin        ....    Luigi
Donald Hewlett     ....    Chief Examiner
Sally Faulkner     .... Mrs. Dent
Maxine Casson          ....    Avril Chalmers
Chrissy Iddon          ....    Lady Snodley
Ballard Berkeley	.... 	Lord Snodley
Suzy Mandel	.... 	Mrs Hargreaves
Damaris Hayman     ....    Tweedy Golfing Lady 
Geoffrey Hughes    ....    Postman
Daniel Chamberlain ...    Jason Noggett
Lewis Collins      ....    Rugby Player

Bibliography

References

External links
 

1976 films
1970s sex comedy films
Films shot at EMI-Elstree Studios
1970s English-language films
Films based on British novels
Films directed by Norman Cohen
British sex comedy films
Films with screenplays by Christopher Wood (writer)
Driver's education
1976 comedy films
1970s British films